The Women's U23 African Volleyball Championship is a national teams continental sport competition for players under 23 years, held biannually and organized by the African Volleyball Confederation since 2014.

Summary

Teams reaching the top four

Participation by nation

MVP by edition
2014 – 
2016 –

Medal summary

See also
Men's U23 African Volleyball Championship

References

U23
U23